The Afghan mujahideen were various armed Islamist rebel groups that fought against the government of the Democratic Republic of Afghanistan and the Soviet Union during the Soviet–Afghan War and the subsequent First Afghan Civil War. The term mujahideen is used in a religious context by Muslims to refer to those engaged in a struggle of any nature for the sake of Islam, commonly referred to as jihad. The Afghan mujahideen consisted of numerous groups that differed from each other across ethnic and/or ideological lines, but were united by their anti-communist and pro-Islamic goals. The union was also widely referred to by their Western backers as the Afghan resistance, while Western press often referred to them as Muslim rebels, guerrillas, or "Mountain Men". They were popularly referred to by Soviet troops as dukhi as derivation from Dari word دشمان dushman, which turned into short dukh and also was suitable due to their guerrilla tactics; Afghan civilians often referred to them as the tanzim, while the Afghan government called them dushman, a term also employed by the Soviets.

The militants of the Afghan mujahideen were recruited and organized immediately after the Soviet Union invaded Afghanistan in 1979, initially from the regular Afghan population and defectors from the Afghan military, with the aim of waging an armed struggle against both the communist government of the People's Democratic Party of Afghanistan, which had taken power in the 1978 Saur Revolution, and the Soviet Union, which had invaded the country in support of the former. There were many ideologically different factions among the mujahideen, with the most influential being the Jamiat-e Islami and Hezb-e Islami Gulbuddin parties. The Afghan mujahideen were generally divided into two distinct alliances: the larger and more significant Sunni Islamic union collectively referred to as the "Peshawar Seven", based in Pakistan, and the smaller Shia Islamic union collectively referred to as the "Tehran Eight", based in Iran; as well as independent units that referred to themselves as "mujahideen". The "Peshawar Seven" alliance received heavy assistance from the United States (Operation Cyclone), the United Kingdom, Pakistan, Saudi Arabia, China, as well as other countries and private international donors.

The basic units of the mujahideen continued to reflect the highly decentralized nature of Afghan society and strong loci of competing Pashtun tribal groups, which had formed a union with other Afghan groups under intense American, Saudi Arabian and Pakistani pressure. The alliance sought to function as a united diplomatic front towards the international community, and sought representation in the United Nations and the Organisation of the Islamic Conference. The Afghan mujahideen also saw thousands of volunteers from various Muslim countries come to Afghanistan to aid the resistance. The majority of the international fighters came from the Arab world, and later became known as Afghan Arabs; the most well-known Arab financier and militant of the group during this period was Osama bin Laden, who would later mastermind the September 11 attacks on the United States. Other international fighters from the Indian subcontinent became involved in terrorist activities in Kashmir and against the states of Bangladesh and Myanmar during the 1990s.

The mujahideen guerrillas fought a long and costly war against the Soviet military, which suffered heavy losses and withdrew from the country in 1989, after which the rebels' war against the communist Afghan government continued. The loosely-aligned mujahideen took the capital city of Kabul in 1992 following the collapse of the Moscow-backed government. However, the new mujahideen government that was formed by the Peshawar Accords following these events was quickly fractured by rival factions and became severely dysfunctional. This unrest quickly escalated into a second civil war, which saw the large-scale collapse of the united Afghan mujahideen and the victorious emergence of the Taliban, which established the Islamic Emirate of Afghanistan shortly after taking most of the country in 1996. The Taliban groups were then ousted in 2001, but regrouped and retook the country in 2021.

Origins and formation
Small groups of resistance formed in parts of eastern Afghanistan by the fall of 1978, but it was in early 1979 that the situation rapidly escalated to open rebellion. As early as February 2, 1979, it was reported that Afghan dissidents were receiving guerilla training across the border in Pakistan. The conflict reached a height during the Herat mutiny in March, in which a non-organized group of army mutineers and the civilians rebelled and briefly overthrew the city garrison. The incident and subsequent air bombardment gave indications of looming civil war. Sibghatullah Mojaddedi, a leader of Islamic mysticism and a hazrat, was one of the original leaders of an organized anti-government armed group. He created an organization named Afghan National Liberation Front (Jabha-i Nejat-i Milli) and on May 25, 1979, appealed for support in New York City. Sayyed Ahmad Gailani, a spiritual leader (pir), also created a resistance organization during this time, called National Islamic Front (Mahaz-e-Millie-Islami). Mawlawi Mohammad Nabi Mohammadi, a religious scholar and former member of parliament in the Kingdom, formed the Revolutionary Islamic Movement (Harakat-e-Inqilab-e-Islami); he was well known for assaulting prominent leftist Babrak Karmal inside the House of Representatives in 1966. On August 11, 1979, the Afghan National Liberation Front along with three others groups (Jamiat-i Islami, Hezb-i Islami Khalis, and Revolutionary Islamic Movement) formed a new organization based in Peshawar, Pakistan, aiming to establish an Islamic Republic. Other rebel movements were also active throughout the country, including Hazara tribes that had some 5,000 men as of August 1979.

A broad mujahideen had existed as a de facto political bloc since May 1979, when the Pakistani government decided to limit the flow of financial aid to the said seven organizations, thus cutting off monetary supply to nationalist and left-wing resistance groups.

The Soviet operation of December 1979 turned the civil war into a war of liberation, and the jihad (holy war) was more forceful than previous Afghan empires had fought against the British and the Sikhs. Except for pockets of supporters of the DRA regime, almost every social, religious and ethnic group protested the Soviet action (despite their removal of the tyrannical Khalq regime), and even religious minorities of Afghan Sikhs and Hindus covertly assisted the mujahideen. Following the exodus of Afghans to Pakistan in 1980, as many as 84 different resistance groups were formed in Peshawar. A coalition of the resistance with a united front for military activities was demanded by Afghan refugees during meetings in Peshawar in 1980. They, including tribal and community elders, former members of parliament and mujahideen commanders, met in several loya jirgas (traditional grand assembly) to solidify the resistance, liberate Afghanistan from the Soviet Union, topple the Kabul regime, and create a single political bloc. Mojaddedi took part in these, and the first jirga passed a resolution on February 21, 1980. The last round of the jirga in May 1980 set up the Islamic National Revolutionary Council, headed by Mohammad Omar Babrakzay as acting president. It advocated for a national, Islamic, and democratic republic. The pressure persuaded leaders of the Islamic groups to make attempts to unite. A coalition of the three Islamist and three moderate organizations, the Islamic Union for the Liberation of Afghanistan, was formed, headed by Abdul Rasul Sayyaf. However, it did not last, as Gulbuddin Hekmatyar's group (Hizb-i Islami Gulbuddin) and later the three moderate groups seceded from it. These three set up the Union of the Three. The Islamic Union later called the tribal Revolutionary Council an "enemy".

Because of disunity, elders from western Afghanistan attempted to hold a loya jirga, citing that party politics disunited the resisting Afghans. Fundamentalists warned against people attending the jirga, but it was held safely in September 1981 in Pishin, Pakistan, consisting of tribal elders, the Ulama, and military officers. Elders native from Nangarhar proposed that the former Afghan king, Mohammed Zahir Shah, would be an ideal "National Leader" in any coalition. However, Pakistan, which preferred a divided Afghan resistance, was against the return of the former king to Afghanistan, seeing it as a symbol of Afghan nationalism.

Groups
There were seven major mujahideen groups as recognized by Pakistan and its allies, based in Peshawar and sometimes called the Peshawar Seven. They were often categorized into the fundamentalist and traditional; the fundamentalist factions were militarily stronger in the war.
Political Islamist
 Jamiat-i Islami (Islamic Society (of Afghanistan)), a mostly Tajik faction headed by Burhanuddin Rabbani, a former professor of theology at Kabul University, advocating for a semi-democratic Islamic revolutionary state - one of the strongest of the Mujahideen factions
 Hizb-i Islami (Gulbuddin) (Islamic Party), a radical, oppositionist faction headed by Gulbuddin Hekmatyar who enjoyed the largest amount of ISI Pakistan funding, Saudi intelligence funding, and American CIA funding; traditionally strongest in Ghilzai Pashtun tribal regions in the south-east - aimed for a state similar to that founded and led by Khomeini in Iran
 Hizb-i Islami (Khalis) (Islamic Party), a splinter faction headed by theologian Mohammad Yunus Khalis, with its supporter base having been Ghilzai Pashtuns - favored cooperation with other factions
 Ittihad-i Islami (Islamic Union (for the liberation of Afghanistan)), a faction advocating for Wahhabism, led by fundamentalist Abdul Rasul Sayyaf and funded by Saudi Arabia; smaller than the other parties, but influential in international recruitment for the jihad

Afghan traditionalist
 Harakat-i Inqilab-i Islami (Revolutionary Islamic Movement (of Afghanistan)), a Pashtun faction led by Mohammad Nabi Mohammadi, a religious figure and former member of parliament, and gaining support among Pashtun tribes in the south
 Jabha-i Nejat-i Milli ((Afghan) National Liberation Front), headed by the Sufi order Sibghatullah Mojaddedi, a monarchist faction that favored the return of Afghanistan's ousted King, Zahir Shah, in a traditional Islamic state with a parliamentary democracy; it was said to be the weakest militarily, although with a respected leader
 Mahaz-i Milli (National (Islamic) Front), the most secular, pro-Western and liberal of the mujahideen factions, rejecting both communism and Islamic fundamentalism, instead adhering to Pashtun nationalism, democracy and a return of the monarchy; led by Sayid Ahmad Gailani, an Islamic mystical figure, and supported by a number of tribal leaders

Commanders

Some of the group leaders also acted as commanders, such as Khalis and Hekmatyar. The other notable mujahideen commanders were Ahmad Shah Massoud (Jamiat-i Islami), Abdul Haq (Hizb-i Islami Khalis), Ismail Khan (Jamiat-i Islami), Jalaluddin Haqqani (Hizb-i Islami Khalis), Amin Wardak (Mahaz-e Melli) and Mohammad Zabihullah (Jamiat-i Islami).

Ideologies and divisions

The Afghan mujahideen were not a united movement. The resistance parties remained deeply divided along ethnic, ideological and personal lines, despite internal and external pressures to unite. Dutch journalist Jere Van Dyk reported in 1981 that the guerillas were effectively fighting two civil wars: one against the regime and the Soviets, and another among themselves. Gulbuddin Hekmatyar's Hizb-i Islami was most cited as the initiator of cross-mujahideen clashes. Through the years, there were various efforts to create a united front, but all were either non-effective or failed in a short time. At least three different iterations of an "Islamic Unity of Afghan Mujahedin" (IUAM) were tried, none of which lasted. The formation of the Afghanistan Interim Government (AIG) in 1988 also failed to promote unity. Additionally, it only included the select Sunni Muslim groups approved by Pakistan; Shi'ite groups backed by Iran and pro-Chinese (anti-Soviet) leftist groups were excluded.

Mujahideen leader Mohammad Yunus Khalis thought that the lack of trust among the various leaders was a factor for the many disunited organizations.

The issue of the exiled king, Mohammed Zahir Shah, also caused divisions. Zahir Shah enjoyed considerable popularity among the Afghan refugees in Pakistan. Both Hekmatyar and Khalis were strongly against the king, while Gailani, Mojaddedi and Mohammadi supported an interim coalition with him. Rabbani and Sayyaf were initially against a role for the king, later changing their minds.

Although the Afghan mujahideen were praised for bravery in resisting a superpower, the lack of unity showed weaknesses in the guerillas, such as the lack of a clear political strategy.

In an attempt to dissuade infighting and develop a de facto functioning proto state, Ahmad Shah Massoud created the Shura-e Nazar in 1984, an offshoot of the Jamiat faction. Shura-e Nazar was created as a military–political combination and consisted of an organized structure dealing with health and education in the areas it operated in (northern and north-eastern Afghanistan).

Attempts at unity
In 1981 the Islamist groups formed a broader alliance, the Union of the Seven, made up of the three Islamist groups, the newly formed organization led by Sayyaf, and three splinter groups. But many differences remained between them. In 1985, under pressure from the king of Saudi Arabia – which was a major donor to the mujahideen – a more broad coalition was created, named Islamic Unity of Afghan Mujahideen (IUAM), comprising the four main Islamist and three moderate groups. It was also nicknamed the Seven Party Mujahideen Alliance, the Peshawar Seven, and the Seven Dwarves.

In 1989 under the patronage of Pakistan and Saudi Arabia, the Afghan Interim Government (AIG) was formed in Pakistan to coincide with the withdrawal of Soviet troops from Afghanistan. Headed by traditionalist Sibghatullah Mojaddedi, with orthodox Abdul Rasul Sayyaf as prime minister, the AIG represented itself as a government in exile and a legitimate incoming state following the Soviet withdrawal. The two individuals proved popular, despite not being leaders of major groups, with Sayyaf said to have had exceptional ability in solving issues. However, the AIG was weak, as it only included the Peshawar Seven and not nationalists or tribal elders. After the Soviet withdrawal, the AIG attempted to establish itself within Afghan territory – the mujahideen attacked the city of Jalalabad in March 1989, visioning a final victory towards Kabul, but were disastrously defeated by the Afghan Army. The rivalry between Hekmatyar and the Jamiat-i Islami only increased, leading to Hekmatyar's resignation from the AIG. He eventually decided to go at the Kabul regime in a very different way: a coalition with Khalq communists of General Shahnawaz Tanai, which caused many resignations in his party in protest. Together, they launched a coup attempt in 1990 to oust the Parchamite Mohammed Najibullah, but failed.

Other resistance groups

Shi'ite groups

A number of Shia militia groups also operated, mainly in central Afghanistan populated by ethnic Hazaras. These groups were also, similarly, divided between themselves. Sayyid Ali Beheshti's Shura-i Inqilab-i Ittifaq, a traditionalist group, controlled the Hazarajat at first, but pro-Iran Khomeinist groups challenged them and took control of the region from them. By the mid-1980s the strongest of these was Sazman-i Nasr, while Shura-i Inqilab-i Ittifaq was prominent only in Maidan Wardak. They united as the "Tehran Eight" in 1987 (so-called due to Iranian support). In 1989, most of these merged into one group, Hezb-e Wahdat.

Maoist groups

There were also Maoist militias that fought against the Soviets and the Afghan regime, as well as the Mujahideen. They were initially well organized and carried out attacks in Kabul; the KGB then had a policy of clearing Kabul of any pro-Chinese elements. A mild suspicion from the KHAD was enough to put someone in prison by accusing them of being a pro-Chinese communist. The People's Republic of China, which was a backer of the main Pakistan-based Mujahideen, was either unable or unwilling to help the Afghan Maoists. Majid Kalakani, a prominent figure and leader of the Liberation Organization of the People of Afghanistan (SAMA), was executed by the Afghan regime in June 1980. Members of Shola-e Javid ("Eternal Flame") were involved in fighting the government and mujahideen (particularly Hezb-i Islami). The Babrak Karmal government arrested many of its members in June 1981.

Smaller groups
Smaller mujahideen groups not connected to the main seven parties include the Sharafat Kuh Front in Farah Province and Harakat-e-Mulavi. Additionally a Baloch nationalist group operated called the Nimruz Front.

The Settam-e-Melli was a small long-time splinter faction of the PDPA based in Badakhshan Province that fought against the regime and other Mujahideen. They were driven out of Panjshir Valley by Massoud's mujahideen forces in 1981. By 1983 its resistance seemed to have ceased as it appeared to join the Karmal government.

The moderate Afghan Social Democratic Party (Afghan Millat), formed in the 1960s, also resisted in the early days of the war. It was treated as a pariah by the recognized Peshawar-based mujahideen groups. Its guerilla band was heavily damaged in September 1980 following an attack by Hekmatyar's mujahideen forces. The regime in Kabul neutralized an Afghan Millat unit in the city in 1983.

Equipment

Most of the Mujahideen's weapons were of Soviet design; this includes mostly those that were supplied by their funders and smaller numbers that were captured from the Soviet or Afghan militaries. It was disclosed in 1981 that recoilless rifles (Chinese 83mm, Blo, 70mm) were being used by the resistance. Also in use were Soviet 82 mm mortars, British mortars and Chinese Type 63 mortars. Twin barrelled Chinese-built Type 58s has been seen in smaller numbers. Lee–Enfield rifles, Egyptian made AKMs, and Chinese made SKSs have also been used by them.

Beginning in 1985, they began to receive heavy equipment like bazookas and heavy machine guns, while also receiving better equipment for the cold winters, such as snow boots and ski tents. The raised fundings or assistance from the United States, China and Saudi Arabia all contributed to strengthening the Mujahideen movement by 1987.

The portable surface-to-air "Stinger" missile was first used by Mujahedin in September 1986 and is considered by some to have been a turning point in the war. Some military analysts considered it a "game changer" coined the term "Stinger effect" to describe it. However, these statistics are based on Mujahedin self-reporting, which is of unknown reliability. A Russian general however claimed the United States "greatly exaggerated" Soviet and Afghan aircraft losses during the war.

Allies and funding

The mujahideen were heavily backed by Pakistan (through the Inter-Services Intelligence) and the United States (through the Central Intelligence Agency), also receiving backing primarily from Saudi Arabia and the People's Republic of China, while more covert support came from the United Kingdom, Egypt, and West Germany (through the Federal Intelligence Service). The Hezb-i Islami Gulbuddin faction received the lion's share of weapons from the ISI and CIA. While Ahmad Shah Massoud's group was supported by Britain's MI6 and trained and supplied by the SAS. Britain's support to the Afghan resistance turned out to be Whitehall's most extensive covert operation since the Second World War.  The CIA's Operation Cyclone was said to be its "largest and 'most successful' covert operation ever." Pakistan controlled which rebels received assistance: the four "fundamentalist" factions received most of the funding. A large amount of funding also came from private donors and charities from the Arab states of the Persian Gulf.

Areas of activity

By May 1980, mujahideen controlled virtually all of rural Afghanistan, and these regions were cleared of Khalqists and Parchamites. With the exception of parts of the north near the Soviet border (under Abdul Rashid Dostum's command), along with several cities, mujahideen guerillas were in control of most of the country as of 1987.

As of 1985, the Jamiat-i Islami held some of the most territory, stretching from Herat in the west through the north to Badakhshan in the north-east. Harakat-i Inqilab also held a large amount of territory in the southern provinces, stretching from Nimroz to Logar. Hizb-i Islami Khalis had its stronghold around Nangarhar and Paktia, while Hizb-i Islami Gulbuddin held many pockets of territory throughout the country. The Mahaz-i-Milli was prominent in Loya Paktia but also had territory in other parts of the country.

As Soviet forces withdrew in 1988–89, the Mujahideen captured several key districts, towns and provincial capitals, such as Taloqan, Mahmud Raqi, Asadabad, Bamyan, Spin Boldak, Dara-i-Suf and Imam Sahib. The cities of Kunduz, Qalat, and Maidan Shahr also fell to the Mujahideen in the summer of 1988, but were retaken by the government with Soviet bombardment and logistical support.

By the time Soviet forces completed their withdrawal, the Afghan government held only sixty urban centers and the Mujahideen controlled six entire provinces. However, the Mujahideen were unable to seize the country's major cities for several years, due to the lack of coordination between the various groups and the lack of heavy firepower necessary for such actions. The Afghan Army beat back the Mujahideen's attempts to take the city of Jalalabad in March 1989, and the civil war settled into a stalemate for three years.

Role of women
Women also played a part in the Afghan mujahideen, often traveling with them to cook food or wash their clothes, but also taking part in weapons smuggling. There were many female sympathizers who encouraged their husbands, sons or other male family members to take part in the war against the invaders. However, women in Afghanistan were split between the two sides, with many also supporting the Democratic Republic where they enjoyed social privileges. Female refugees also created and recited Landays (traditional Afghan poems) about the war.

There is one recorded female mujahideen warlord, Bibi Ayesha (nicknamed Kaftar, meaning "dove"), who operated in Baghlan Province.

Soviet withdrawal and civil war

On 14 April 1988, the governments of Afghanistan and Pakistan signed the Geneva Accords, guaranteed by the United States and Soviet Union.  This committed the Soviet Union to withdraw all its troops from Afghanistan by 15 February 1989.  The withdrawal was conducted in two phases. The first half of the contingent was removed between 15 May and 16 August 1988, and the second half after 15 November 1988.  As the Soviets withdrew, they left the Afghan army in fortified positions and even helped them conduct counteroffensives, in order to leave them in as strong a position as possible. The withdrawal was completed on schedule, with commander Boris Gromov of the 40th Army being the last Soviet soldier to leave Afghanistan.  After the Soviet withdrawal, most of the Afghan mujahideen continued its fight against the government of Mohammad Najibullah, which continued to receive funding from Moscow, while similarly the Mujahideen was also still receiving funding from Washington and Islamabad.

Despite initial estimates, the Mujahideen proved unable to topple Najibullah's regime immediately after the Soviet withdrawal.  The government concentrated its forces in defense of key cities, while relying on vast amounts of military and humanitarian aid from the Soviet Union to stay afloat. Soviet military advisors were still present in Afghanistan, helping advise the war effort and even coordinate air strikes. Soviet volunteers operated the Scud missiles which gave the government an advantage in firepower. The Afghan Air Force, supplied and maintained with Soviet support, proved to be a crucial asset in keeping the government in power. As late as December 1991, Soviet pilots were recorded flying bombing missions against the Mujahideen.

The Mujahideen's divisions and factionalism hindered their war effort, and skirmishes between rival groups became common.  Massoud was one of the most active elements in this time. In both 1990 and 1991 he staged spring offensives, capturing several cities and steadily expanding the territory under his influence. The government meanwhile came to rely heavily on tribal militias to stay in power, primarily the Jowzjani militia of Abdul Rashid Dostum.  After 1989, these were the only forces capable of offensives against the Mujahideen.

By the summer of 1990, the Afghan government forces were on the defensive again, and by the beginning of 1991 the government controlled only 10 percent of Afghanistan. In March 1991, Mujahideen forces captured the city of Khost ending an eleven-year siege. After the failed coup d'état attempt by hardliners in the Soviet Union in August 1991, Soviet support to Najibullah's government dried up. This effectively doomed it, as the Afghan Air Force could no longer fly due to fuel shortages. Consequently, the Army's desertion rate skyrocketed. In March 1992, Dostum's militiamen defected to Massoud after negotiations, and Najibullah's regime fell shortly afterwards.

In 1991, some factions of the Mujahideen were deployed in Kuwait to fight Iraq. After Hekmatyar and Sayyaf publicly denounced the U.S. and the Saudi royal family for their role in the Gulf War, U.S. and Saudi officials indicated that they would stop funding both commanders, but this did not happen. However, the CIA and Saudi intelligence pressured the ISI to send captured Iraqi tanks to Haqqani instead of Hekmatyar. In 1993, it was reported that some Mujahideen were deployed in the Caucusus to fight the forces of Armenia in the First Nagorno-Karabakh War. Afghan mujahideen fighters have also been reportedly involved in the civil war in Tajikistan during 1992–1993.

After the War

After Najibullah's government collapsed, the Mujahideen factions (apart from Hezb-i Islami Gulbuddin) signed a power sharing agreement (the Peshawar Accord) and captured Kabul on April 28, 1992, celebrating their "Victory Day". However, the divisions between the various factions were still there and it was a catalyst that led to another civil war between the new government and Mujahideen factions that rebelled against it. This meant that after 1992, various Mujahideen factions including the Shi'ite Hezb-i Wahdat continued to exist as militias rather than merely political parties, with many fighters being loyal to specific leaders.

Relationship with the Taliban
The Taliban is a puritanical movement that was formed in 1994, five years after the end of the Soviet–Afghan War and in the midst of anarchy in Afghanistan. Supported by Pakistan and recruited from religious students from madrasas across the border, it won a highly effective military campaign against former Mujahideen factions in the civil war, gaining control and establishing the Islamic Emirate in 1996. Nearly all of the Taliban's original leadership fought in the Soviet–Afghan War for either the Hezb-i Islami Khalis or Harakat-i Inqilab-e Islami factions of the Mujahideen.

Veteran mujahideen leaders who fought against the Soviets were divided regarding the Taliban. Yunus Khalis was a strong supporter of the Taliban and Nabi Mohammadi also supported them, even dissolving his own organization in doing so. However, Rabbani and Sayyaf were against the Taliban and formed a new united opposition force called the Northern Alliance, which also recruited Abdul Qadeer (a commander who defected from Khalis's faction), prominent Shi'ite leaders such as Muhammad Mohaqiq, and former DRA commander Abdul Rashid Dostum. This group was supported following the United States invasion of Afghanistan in 2001 that successfully drove out the Taliban and led to the rise of Hamid Karzai.

See also
 Afghanistan–Pakistan relations
 Pakistan–United States relations

References

Bibliography
 Kaplan, Robert D. Soldiers of God: With the Mujahidin in Afghanistan. Boston: Houghton Mifflin Company, 1990. 
 Weisman, Steven R. "Rebel Rivalry is Hampering Afghan Talks", The New York Times, March 1, 1988.

Anti-Soviet factions in the Soviet–Afghan War
Anti-communist terrorism
Islamist groups
Islamism in Afghanistan
 
Rebel groups in Afghanistan
Defunct political party alliances in Afghanistan
History of Islam in Afghanistan
CIA and Islamism
Mujahideen